Isolate may refer to:

Arts, entertainment, and media
 Isolate (film), a 2013 Australian film
 Isolate (Circus Maximus album), 2007
 Isolate (Gary Numan album), 1992

Language
 Isolating language, with near-unity morpheme/word ratio
 Language isolate, unrelated to any other

Science and technology
 The product of isolation (microbiology), may be called:
 an isolate;
 specifically a fungal isolate;
 a variant (biology);
 or a strain (biology).
 Chemical isolate, from chemical purification
 Protein isolate
 Genetic isolate, a population that does not mix with organisms of the same species
 Isolate (computation), in the Java Application Isolation API
 Primary isolate, a microbial sample from an infected individual

See also
 
 
 Isolation (disambiguation)